Jan Oscar Stabe Helvig (born 2 October 1995) is a Norwegian competitive rower, born in Oslo. He competed at the 2020 Summer Olympics in Tokyo 2021, in men's quadruple sculls.

References

External links
 
 
 
 

 

1995 births
Living people
Rowers from Oslo
Norwegian male rowers
Rowers at the 2020 Summer Olympics
Olympic rowers of Norway